The ABC Scorpion is a 30 hp (22 kW) two-cylinder aero engine designed by British engineer Granville Bradshaw for use in light aircraft. The engine was built by ABC Motors Limited and first ran in 1921.

Variants
Scorpion I
1923, 30 hp (22 kW)
Scorpion II
1924, 34 hp (25 kW), increased bore and stroke.

Applications

 ABC Robin
 Boulton Paul Phoenix
 BFW M.19
 BFW M.23
 Comper Swift
 de Havilland Humming Bird
 Farman Moustique
 Hawker Cygnet
 Heath Parasol
 Hendy Hobo
 Henderson-Glenny Gadfly
 Kay Gyroplane
 Luton Minor
 Mignet HM.14 Pou-du-Ciel
 Parmentier Wee Mite
 Peyret-Mauboussin PM X
 RWD 1
 SAI KZ I
 Saynor & Bell Canadian Cub
 Short Satellite
 Snyder Buzzard
 Udet U 7 Kolibri
 Wheeler Slymph
 Westland Woodpigeon

Survivors
The only ANEC II (G-EBJO) flies regularly at the Shuttleworth Collection at Old Warden and is powered by a Scorpion II.

Specifications (Scorpion I)

See also

References

Notes

Bibliography

 Gunston, Bill. World Encyclopedia of Aero Engines. Cambridge, England. Patrick Stephens Limited, 1989. 
 Guttery, T.E. The Shuttleworth Collection. London: Wm. Carling, 1969. 
 Lumsden, Alec. British Piston Engines and their Aircraft. Marlborough, Wiltshire: Airlife Publishing, 2003. .

Scorpion
1920s aircraft piston engines